Events in the year 1943 in China. The country had an estimated population of 444,801,000 in the mainland and 6,507,000 in Taiwan.

Incumbents
 President: Lin Sen (until 1 August), Chiang Kai-shek (from 1 August)
 Premier: Chiang Kai-shek
 Vice Premier: Kung Hsiang-hsi

Events
 Continuing Chinese famine of 1942-43
 11 January - Conclusion of the Sino-British Treaty for the Relinquishment of Extra-Territorial Rights in China
 11 January - Signing of the Sino-American Treaty for the Relinquishment of Extraterritorial Rights in China
 9 - 12 May - Changjiao massacre
 12 May - 3 June - Battle of West Hubei
 20 May - Ratification and entry into force of the Sino-British Treaty for the Relinquishment of Extra-Territorial Rights in China
 May - Ratification and entry into force of the Sino-American Treaty for the Relinquishment of Extraterritorial Rights in China
 Disestablishment of the United States Court for China
 18 August - Start of the Linnan Campaign
 2 November - 20 December - Battle of Changde
 Opening of the Sup'ung Dam, in Liaoning

Births 

 Abdurehim Haji Amin
 Liu Jingnan
 Pan Wuyun
 Fang Chengguo
 Xie Shengwu
 Guo Ruilong

Deaths 

 Chen Tanqiu
 Gao Enhong
 Lin Sen
 Mao Zemin
 Jiang Chaozong

See also
 List of Chinese films of the 1940s

References

 
1940s in China
Years of the 20th century in China